The National Science and Technology Council (NSTC) is a council in the Executive Branch of the United States. It is designed to coordinate science and technology policy across the branches of federal government.

History

The National Science and Technology Council (NSTC) was established by President Bill Clinton through Executive Order 12881 on November 23, 1993. Each presidential administration has utilized the NSTC in varying fashions. During the Clinton administration, the NSTC wrote 6 Presidential Review Directives, used for President Clinton's own future directives. The council has not issued any of these since. Instead, the council's recommendations often serve as advice for other committees as policy is drafted. Members of the science and technology community have debated whether the NSTC should play a more direct role in policymaking by issuing formal directives and having increased authority.

The structure of the NSTC has changed multiple times in the last few decades. Under the Obama Administration, the Council's subcommittees were restructured and a new committee for directing STEM education was added. A committee focused on science and technology enterprise was added under the Trump Administration, as well as special committees on artificial intelligence and research environments.

Mission
The primary functions of the NSTC are:

 to coordinate the science and technology policy-making process;
 to ensure science and technology policy decisions and programs are consistent with the President's stated goals;
 to help integrate the President's science and technology policy agenda across the Federal Government;
 to ensure science and technology are considered in development and implementation of Federal policies and programs; and
 to further international cooperation in science and technology.

Another objective of the NSTC is the establishment of clear national goals for federal science and technology investments in virtually all the mission areas of the executive branch. The Council prepares research and development strategies that are coordinated across federal agencies to form investment packages aimed at accomplishing multiple national goals. While a fundamental mission of the NSTC is to further the President's scientific policies, it also has been directly and indirectly charged by Congress to coordinate activities in a number of federal projects. These include combating ocean acidification, overseeing the National Nanotechnology Program, and supporting STEM education.

Committees 
At present, the work of the NSTC is organized under six primary committees and two special committees. Each committee oversees theme-specific subcommittees and working groups.

List of Committees 
Primary Committees:Special Committees:

Committee Membership 
The NSTC is chaired by the President. The rest of the NSTC membership is made up of Cabinet Secretaries and Agency Heads with significant science and technology responsibilities, and other White House officials and advisors where necessary. The APST is responsible for managing the NSTC. The Office of Science and Technology Policy (OSTP) Director Kelvin Droegemeier managed the NSTC under the Trump administration even though Executive Order 12881 does not include the OSTP Director in the NSTC. The president and cabinet-level officials are rarely present at meetings of the NSTC. Therefore, NSTC activities are carried out by OSTP and NSTC staff in collaboration with federal agency staff. Federal agencies assign staff to the NSTC and their numbers have ranged from 5 to 21 members in previous years.

Member Agencies 
Agencies represented in the NSTC include:

Funding 
As the NSTC does not receive direct appropriations, member agencies contribute funding to the projects that the NSTC oversees. From FY2010 to FY2018, their contributions ranged from $12 million to $18 million per year and funding was $17.1 million in FY2018. These funds go towards multi-agency projects. The rest of the funding comes from agency contributions to their own internal NSTC projects or the OSTP infrastructure contributions.

Key Staff

 Chair: President Joe Biden
 Managing Authority: Arati Prabhakar, Director of OSTP
Executive Director: OSTP
Former Executive Directors include: Chloe Kontos (service years, 2017-2021), Afua Bruce (2016-2017), Jayne B. Morrow (2013-2015), Pedro Espina 

Primary Committees:

Committee on Science & Technology Enterprise

 Co-Chair: Kelvin Droegemeier, Director of OSTP
 Co-Chair: Walter Copan, Under Secretary of Commerce for Standards and Technology and Director of the National Institute for Standards and Technology (NIST)
 Co-Chair: Sethuraman Panchanathan, Director of the National Science Foundation (NSF)
 Co-Chair: Paul Dabbar, Under Secretary for Science at the Department of Energy (DOE)

Committee on Environment

 Co-Chair: Deerin Babb-Brott, OSTP
 Co-Chair: Neil Jacobs, Assistant Secretary of Commerce for Environmental Observation and Prediction at the NOAA
 Co-Chair: David Ross, Assistant Administrator for Water (EPA)
 Co-Chair: Tim Petty, Assistant Secretary for Water and Science at the Department of Interior (DOI)

Committee on Homeland and National Security (CHNS)

 Co-Chair: Aaron Miles, OSTP
 Co-Chair: Jih-Fen Lei, Director of Defense Research and Engineering for Research and Technology at the Department of Defense
 Co-Chair: Bill Bryan, Undersecretary for Science and Technology at the Department of Homeland Security

Committee on Science (CoS)

 Co-Chair: Kelvin Droegemeier, Director of OSTP
 Co-Chair: Sethuraman Panchanathan, Director of the National Science Foundation (NSF)
 Co-Chair: Francis Collins, Director of the National Institutes of Health

Committee on STEM Education (CoSTEM)

 Co-Chair: Kelvin Droegemeier, Director of OSTP
 Co-Chair: Sethuraman Panchanathan, Director of the National Science Foundation (NSF)
 Co-Chair: Jim Bridenstine, Administrator of the National Aeronautics and Space Administration (NASA)

Committee on Technology (CoT)

 Co-Chair: Michael Kratsios, U.S. Chief Technology Officer
 Co-Chair: Walter Copan, NIST
 Co-Chair: Paul Dabbar, DOE

Special Committees:

Select Committee on Artificial Intelligence

 Co-Chair: Michael Kratsios, U.S. Chief Technology Officer
 Co-Chair: Sethuraman Panchanathan, Director of the National Science Foundation (NSF)
 Co-Chair: Peter Highnam, Director of the Defense Advanced Research Projects Agency (DARPA)

Joint Committee on Research Environment

 Co-Chair: Kelvin Droegemeier, Director of OSTP
 Co-Chair: Walter Copan, Under Secretary of Commerce for Standards and Technology and Director of the National Institute for Standards and Technology (NIST)
 Co-Chair: Sethuraman Panchanathan, Director of the National Science Foundation (NSF)
 Co-Chair: Paul Dabbar, Under Secretary for Science at the Department of Energy (DOE)
 Co-Chair: Francis Collins, Director of the National Institutes of Health

See also 

 Office of Science and Technology Policy (OSTP)
 President's Council of Advisors on Science and Technology (PCAST)

References

External links
 National Science and Technology Council

Agencies of the United States government
Science and technology in the United States
United States national commissions